Synaptocochlea caliginosa is a species of sea snail, a marine gastropod mollusk in the family Trochidae, the top snails.

Description
The oblong, imperforate shell is ear-shaped. Its color is blackish. The spire is small. The shell is transversely lirate, larger and smaller lirae alternating, obsoletely articulated with white. The oblong aperture is  very oblique, greenish white within. Its black margin is crenulate. The inner
lip is rather flattened. There is a narrow lunar umbilical rimation. The thin operculum is orbicular and multispiral

Distribution
This marine species occurs in the Indian Ocean off Mauritius.

References

 Trew, A., 1984. The Melvill-Tomlin Collection. Part 30. Trochacea. Handlists of the Molluscan Collections in the Department of Zoology, National Museum of Wales.

caliginosa
Gastropods described in 1863